Jimisola Andreas Laursen (born 13 July 1977 in Malmö) is a retired Swedish sprinter who specialised in the 400 metres. He represented his country at three consecutive World Championships, starting in 2001 where he reached the semifinals. In addition, he won the silver medal at the 2002 European Indoor Championships.

Laursen today works as First Officer for Scandinavian Airlines.

Competition record

Personal bests
Outdoor
100 metres – 10.73 (Vellinge 2001)
200 metres – 21.10 (+0.6 m/s) (St. Martin 2002)
400 metres – 45.54 (Edmonton 2001)
Indoor
60 metres – 6.83 (Malmö 2004)
200 metres – 21.14 (Malmö 2002)
400 metres – 45.59 (Vienna 2002) NR

References

1977 births
Living people
Swedish male sprinters
Sportspeople from Malmö
20th-century Swedish people